The Seamax M-22 is a Brazilian single-engine, amphibious light sport aircraft (LSA) and Fédération Aéronautique Internationale microlight. Originally manufactured by AirMax Construções Aeronáuticas of Jacarepaguá and called the Airmax SeaMax, since 2015 it has been built by Seamax Aircraft of Sao Paulo.

Design and development
The Seamax M-22 was designed in 1999.  A prototype was flown in 2000 and the first production aircraft left the factory in 2001. The Seamax M-22 is constructed using composite materials and metal components. It has a two-seat, side-by-side configuration cabin with a bubble canopy which is hydraulically raised for access. The high-wing is strut-braced and the tail is a cruciform tail. The aircraft's tricycle landing gear is retractable for landing on water. It is powered by a  Rotax 912ULS pusher configuration engine mounted above the wing to avoid water ingestion.

Versions can be constructed to meet the requirements of both the European microlight and US LSA categories.

A total of 160 had been built by 2018.

Specifications

See also

References

2000s Brazilian civil utility aircraft
Amphibious aircraft
Light-sport aircraft
High-wing aircraft
Single-engined pusher aircraft
Aircraft first flown in 2000